This is a list of members of the Victorian Legislative Council, as elected at the 2010 state election and at subsequent appointments.

 Western Metropolitan Labor MLC Martin Pakula resigned on 26 March 2013. Cesar Melhem was appointed as his replacement on 9 May 2013.
 Northern Victoria Liberal MLC Donna Petrovich resigned on 1 July 2013. Amanda Millar was appointed as her replacement on 22 August 2013.
 Eastern Victoria Liberal MLC Philip Davis resigned on 2 February 2014. Andrew Ronalds was appointed as his replacement on 5 February 2014.
 Eastern Victoria National MLC Peter Hall resigned on 17 March 2014. Danny O'Brien was appointed as his replacement on 26 March 2014.
 Northern Victoria Labor MLC Candy Broad resigned on 9 May 2014. Marg Lewis was appointed as her replacement on 11 June.

Members of the Parliament of Victoria by term
21st-century Australian politicians